Easy Land is a 2019 Canadian drama film, written and directed by Sanja Zivkovic. The film stars Mirjana Joković and Nina Kiri as Jasna and Nina, a mother (a trained Architect) and daughter from Serbia who are struggling to adapt to their new lives after emigrating to Canada as refugees.

The film's cast also includes Daniel Kash, Richard Clarkin, Sarah Deakins, Arlene Duncan and Sugith Varughese.

The film premiered at the 2019 Toronto International Film Festival.

References

External links
 
 Easy Land at Library and Archives Canada

2019 films
Canadian drama films
English-language Canadian films
Serbian-Canadian culture
2019 drama films
2010s English-language films
2010s Canadian films